Maui Nō Ka Oi Magazine is a bi-monthly regional magazine published by the Haynes Publishing Group in Wailuku, Hawaii.

The phrase Maui nō ka oi means "Maui is the best" in the Hawaiian language. Maui Nō Ka Oi Magazine features stories relating to the culture, art, dining, environmental issues, current events, recreational activities, and local businesses within Maui County. The magazine is marketed at newsstands across the United States and by subscription, and is distributed as an in-room amenity in resorts.

Since 2002 the magazine has sponsored the Aipono Awards, an annual award in which readers select their favorite restaurants in 25 categories. In 2003 they began celebrating the winners at an annual banquet. Proceeds from the banquet go to the Maui Community College's Culinary Academy.

Maui Nō Ka Oi has a circulation of 25,000 and an estimated readership of 1.44 annually. The magazine has received several Pai awards, which are given out by the Hawaii Publishers Association.

References

External links
Maui Nō Ka Oi Magazine

Bimonthly magazines published in the United States
Culture of Maui
Local interest magazines published in the United States
Magazines published in Hawaii
Magazines with year of establishment missing
Tourism magazines